Cory Kennedy-Levin (born February 21, 1990) is an American Internet celebrity.

Biography 
Kennedy met photographer Mark Hunter (who goes by the alias "The Cobrasnake") at a Blood Brothers concert at the El Rey Theatre in Los Angeles in the summer of 2005. He took some photographs of her for his web site and they exchanged phone numbers. In January 2006 Kennedy began an internship at his office, to fulfill a requirement from her high school for graduation. Hunter's web site featured photos of celebrities at various parties, to which he began bringing Kennedy. Consequently, Hunter and Kennedy began dating with the approval of her parents.

In December 2005, Hunter had posted photos of Kennedy with the title "JFK CORY KENNEDY", which began speculation that she was somehow related to the Kennedy family, which she is not. By April, Hunter claims that he had noticed that every time he posted photos of Kennedy on his site, the web traffic from fashion community sites would spike. Hunter quickly realized that Kennedy had the potential to be a star. That month, as the Kennedy-Levin family visited New York City on vacation, Kennedy and Hunter visited the offices of Nylon magazine, the editor-in-chief of which was a friend of Hunter's. The very next day she was in a photo shoot for an issue focused on music and MySpace, which hit news stands in June.

She was mentioned in an article about interns in The New York Times and LA Weekly's Caroline Ryder did a short article about her. Then in October, she appeared in a mock music video for Good Charlotte's "Keep Your Hands Off My Girl", directed by Nylon'''s editor-in-chief Marvin Scott Jarrett. The entire clip is shot from a single camera at a fixed angle, and consists of Kennedy shaking salt and pepper to the beat while eating Indian food and listening to the song on a portable music player.

Her parents had known about her exposure online but had not realized the extent to which it had grown until the June issue of Nylon appeared. Because Kennedy had been previously treated for clinical depression, their primary concern had been her health and well-being. By September 2006, her celebrity life began to conflict with her home and school life. Worrying for her education, her parents had her placed in a boarding school, a "nonpublic therapeutic placement for kids with various types of learning, behavioral and emotional problems" with limited phone and computer use, although she was free to return home on weekends.

Career highlights
In the fall of 2007, Kennedy was named the face of Urban Decay.
September 2007, appeared on the cover of Jalouse Magazine, shot by French photographer, and video director Jean-Baptiste Mondino.
In May 2008, she starred in an ad campaign for Procter & Gamble's "Sebastian" line of hair products. She was later replaced by Charlotte Ronson.
From May 3-August 31, 2008, photographs of Kennedy were on display in The Andy Warhol Museum (Pittsburgh, PA).  Deemed an 'Uberstar'--along with designer Rami Kashou, photographer Dirk Mai, journalist Rose Apodaca, model/designer Audrey Kitching,  and writer/actor Clint Catalyst—Mai was hand-picked by sculptor/visual artist Glenn Kaino to represent his 21st Century take on Andy Warhol's Superstars. For the exhibit, Kaino took portraits of his "Uberstars" using a Polaroid Big Shot camera, the type of instant camera  Warhol used for his infamous series.  Kaino's Polaroids and Warhol's portraits were then juxtaposed, aligning each of  Kaino's cyber-celebrities to their Warhol superstar-era counterpart. Kennedy's picture was paired with socialite Brigid Berlin.
Kennedy and Hunter both appeared in the first episode of 90210''.

Personal
Kennedy has a fraternal twin sister named Chris.

References

External links
Cory Kennedy Blog

1990 births
Living people
People from Santa Monica, California
American bloggers